Megalographa is a genus of moths of the family Noctuidae.

Species
 Megalographa agualaniata (Dognin, 1912)
 Megalographa biloba (Stephens, 1830)
 Megalographa bonaerensis (Berg, 1882)
 Megalographa culminicola Barbut and Piñas, 2007
 Megalographa monoxyla (Dyar, 1913)
 Megalographa talamanca Lafontaine and Sullivan, 2009

References
 Megalographa at funet.fi
 Natural History Museum Lepidoptera genus database
 A review of the genus Megalographa Lafontaine and Poole (Lepidoptera: Noctuidae: Plusiinae) with the description of a new species from Costa Rica

Plusiinae